Ridwan may refer to:

Riḍwan, the keeper of paradise in Islam
Ridwan (name), an Arabic given masculine name
Radwan (name), a list of people that includes Ridwan
Ridwan (place) or Redwan, a place and a Yazidi principality in the Ottoman Empire
Ridwan dynasty, a Dynastic family in the Ottoman Empire
Ridván, a Bahai festival

See also
Ridvan, a given name
Rizvan, a given name